Byblis guehoi is a species of carnivorous plant in the genus Byblis. It is a compact species and is tetraploid. It was described in 2008 by Allen Lowrie and John Godfrey Conran. It is endemic to the Kimberley region of Western Australia.

References

guehoi
Plants described in 2008
Eudicots of Western Australia